Saint Optatus, sometimes anglicized as St. Optate, was Bishop of Milevis, in Numidia, in the fourth century, remembered for his writings against Donatism.

Biography and context
Optatus was a convert, as we gather from St. Augustine: "Do we not see with how great a booty of gold and silver and garments Cyprian, doctor suavissimus, came forth out of Egypt, and likewise Lactantius, Victorinus, Optatus, Hilary?" (De Doctrina Christ., xl). Optatus probably began as a pagan rhetorician. 

His (untitled) work against the Donatists is an answer to Parmenianus, the successor of Donatus in the primatial see of Carthage. St. Jerome (De viris illustribus, # 110) tells us it was in six books and was written under Valens and Valentinian (364-75). We now possess seven books, and the list of popes is carried as far as Siricius (384-98). Similarly the Donatist succession of antipopes is given (II, IV), as Victor, Bonifatius, Encolpius, Macrobius, Lucianus, Claudianus (the date of the last is about 380), though a few sentences earlier Macrobius is mentioned as the actual bishop. 

The plan of the work is laid down in Book I, and is completed in six books. It seems, then, that the seventh book, which St. Jerome did not know in 392, was an appendix to a new edition in which St. Optatus made additions to the two episcopal lists. The date of the original work is fixed by the statement in I, xiii, that sixty years and more had passed since the persecution of Diocletian (303-5). Photinus (d. 376) is apparently regarded as still alive; Julian is dead (363). Thus the first books were published about 366–70, and the second edition about 385–90.

Doctrine
St. Optatus deals with the entire controversy between Catholics, as the whole church called itself prior to the Great Schism of 1054, the term still used in the creeds of both sides of the Great Schism to this day, and Donatists. He distinguishes between schismatics and heretics. The former have rejected unity, but they have true doctrine and true sacraments, hence Parmenian should not have threatened them (and consequently his own party) with eternal damnation. This mild doctrine is a great contrast to the severity of many of the Fathers against schism. It seems to be motived by the notion that all who have faith will be saved, though after long torments,--a view which St. Augustine has frequently to combat. 

Donatists and Catholics were agreed as to the necessary unity of the Church. The question was, where is this One Church? Optatus argues that it cannot be only in a corner of Africa; it must be the catholica (the word is used as a substantive) which is throughout the world. Parmenian had enumerated six dotes, or properties, of the Church, of which Optatus accepts five, and argues that the first, the cathedra (episcopal chair) belongs to the Catholics, and therefore they have all the others. 

The whole schism has arisen through the quarrel as to the episcopal succession at Carthage, and it might have been expected that Optatus would claim this property of cathedra by pointing out the legitimacy of the Catholic succession at Carthage. But he does not. He replies: "We must examine who sat first in the chair, and where... You cannot deny that you know that in the city of Rome upon Peter first the chair of the bishop was conferred, in which sat the head of all the Apostles, Peter, whence also he was called Cephas, in which one chair unity should be preserved by all, lest the other Apostles should each stand up for his own chair, so that now he should be a schismatic and a sinner who should against this one chair set up another. Therefore in the one chair, which is the first of the dotes Peter first sat, to whom succeeded Linus." An incorrect list of popes follows, ending with, "and to Damasus Siricius, who is to-day our colleague, with whom the whole world with us agrees by the communication of commendatory letters in the fellowship of one communion. Tell us the origin of your chair, you who wish to claim the holy Church for yourselves". Optatus then mocks at the recent succession of Donatist antipopes at Rome. 

Optatus argues, especially in book V, against the doctrine which the Donatists had inherited from St. Cyprian that baptism by those outside the Church cannot be valid, and he anticipates St. Augustine's argument that the faith of the baptizer does not matter, since it is God who confers the grace. His statement of the objective efficacy of the sacraments ex opere operato is well known: "Sacramenta per se esse sancta, non per homines" (V, iv). Thus in baptism there must be the Holy Trinity, the believer and the minister, and their importance is in this order, the third being the least important. In rebuking the sacrileges of the Donatists, he says: "What is so profane as to break, scrape, remove the altars of God, on which you yourselves had once offered, on which both the prayers of the people and the members of Christ have been borne, where God Almighty has been invoked, where the Holy Ghost has been asked for and has come down, from which by many has been received the pledge of eternal salvation and the safeguard of faith and the hope of resurrection? ... For what is an altar but the seat of the Body and Blood of Christ?" 

In book VII a notable argument for unity is added: St. Peter sinned most grievously and denied his Master, yet he retained the keys, and for the sake of unity and charity the Apostles did not separate from his fellowship. Thus Optatus defends the willingness of the Catholics to receive back the Donatists to unity without difficulty, for there must be always sinners in the Church, and the cockle is mixed with the wheat; but charity covers a multitude of sins.

Literary appreciation
The style of St. Optatus is vigorous and animated. He aims at terseness and effect, rather than at flowing periods, and this in spite of the gentleness and charity which is so admirable in his polemics against his "brethren", as he insists on calling the Donatist bishops. He uses Saint Cyprian a great deal, though he refutes his mistaken opinion about baptism, and does not copy his easy style. His descriptions of events are admirable and vivid. 

It is strange that Dupin should have called him minus nitidus ac politus, for both in the words he employs and in their order he almost incurs the blame of preciosity. He is as strict as Cyprian as to the metrical cadences at the close of every sentence. 

He was evidently a man of good taste as well as of high culture, and he has left us in his one work a monument of convincing dialectic, of elegant literary form, and of Christian charity. But the general marshalling of his arguments is not so good as is the development of each by itself. His allegorical interpretations are far-fetched, but those of Parmenian were evidently yet more extravagant. 

An appendix contained an important dossier of documents which had apparently been collected by some Catholic controversialist between 330 and 347. This collection was already mutilated when it was copied by the scribe of the only manuscript which has preserved it, and that manuscript is incomplete, so that we can have to deplore the loss of a great part this first-rate material for the early history of Donatism. We can tell what has been lost by the citations made by Optatus himself and by Augustine.

Veneration
St. Optatus has apparently never received any ecclesiastical cultus; but his name was inserted in the Roman Martyrology on June 4, though it is quite unknown to all the ancient martyrologies and calendars.

The Constantinian Letters in the Appendix of Against the Donatists 
Included after the main body of Optatus' work - originally untitled, now often referred to as Against the Donatists - is an appendix consisting of ten official documents relating to the Donatist Schism. Six of these (nos. 3, 5, 6, 7, 9, and 10) claim to be letters written by Constantine and are addressed to various actors involved in the Donatist Schism, including local officials (nos. 3 and 7), 'Catholic' - i.e. anti-Donatist - bishops (nos. 5, 9 and 10) and one (no. 6) to Donatist bishops. The letters thus show the personal involvement of the Roman emperor in the Donatist controversy between 312/313 and 330 AD. 

Their authenticity, as well as that of the other four documents, has been the source of scholarly debate since the nineteenth century, though they are now generally seen as authentic. The authenticity of some or all documents has been challenged by scholars such as Otto Seeck (1889), Pierre Batiffol (1914), William Hugh Clifford Frend (1952), and Heinz Kraft (1955). Meanwhile, the authenticity of some or all documents has been defended by Louis Duchesne (1890), Norman Hepburn Baynes (1925/1931), H. Chadwick (1954), and Charles Odahl (1993). The authenticity of the documents has often been challenged on the basis of supposed anachronisms in the texts. Pierre Batiffol, for example, rejected Constantian authorship for Appendix 5 because of its use of specifically Christian formulas and Christian doctrines that he felt Constantine would not have used. Batiffol's view has been challenged by Charles Odahl (1993).

M.W. Edwards has argued that the appendix was not edited by Optatus himself, but seems to have compiled by an African belonging to the 'Catholic' party. First, Appendix 5 was composed during the aftermath of the Council of Arles (314), and not during the preparation for the Council of Rome (313), as Optatus suggests. Second, two documents mentioned by Optatus - the epistle of the Donatists to Constantine, cited at I.22, and "the protocol of Cirta", to which Optatus alludes at I.14 - are not included in the appendix. Since the documents mostly involve letters of official correspondence between Emperor Constantine and persons holding authority in Africa and Numidia, or letters written in these provinces and under the supervision of local magistrates, Edwards suggests that "Our archivist [i.e. the compiler of the appendix] would therefore seem to have been an African of the catholic party, who had access to public records in his own country, but did not hold any commerce with the Donatists or take pains in gathering evidence overseas."

Sources
 Quick links to the separate books and parts of ‘Against the Donatists’, in a 1917 translation. www.tertullian.org.

The editio princeps was by Cochlæus (Mainz, 1549). More manuscripts were used by Balduinus (Paris, 1563 and 1569), whose text was frequently reprinted in the seventeenth century. Louis-Ellies Dupin's edition includes a history of the Donatists and a geography of Africa (Paris 1700--); it is reprinted in Gallandi and in Migne (Patrologia Latina, XI). The best edition is that of Ziwza (CSEL, XXVI, Vienna, 1893), with description of the manuscripts.
 Donatism. Online Dynamic Bibliography.

Mireille Labrousse, Sources Chrétiennes 412, 413

Hermann Sieben, Fontes Christiani 56, 2013

References 

Numidian saints
4th-century deaths
4th-century Christian saints
4th-century bishops in Roman North Africa
Year of birth unknown
Year of death unknown
4th-century Latin writers